Alex Türk (born 25 January 1950 in Roubaix) is a member of the Senate of France, representing the Nord department.  He does not align himself with any political party.

References
Page on the Senate website 

1950 births
Living people
French Senators of the Fifth Republic
Senators of Nord (French department)
People from Roubaix
Independent politicians in France